Losonczy is a Hungarian surname. Notable people with the surname include:

 Attila Losonczy (born 1974), Hungarian neuroscientist and professor
 Géza Losonczy (1917–1957), Hungarian journalist and politician
 Thomas Losonczy (born 1953), American fencer

Hungarian-language surnames